He Zhuojia (born 25 October 1998) is a Chinese table tennis player. She is one of the few top players utilizing long pips.

She won the 2014 Argentina Open when she was 15 years old. She also had a memorable run at the 2018 ITTF World Tour Grand Finals, where she knocked out three higher-seeded players before losing to Chen Meng in the final.

Singles titles

References

Table tennis players from Shijiazhuang
1998 births
Living people
Chinese female table tennis players